, also known as , is a fictional character from Konami's Metal Gear series who made her first appearance in Metal Gear Solid 3: Snake Eater.

Appearances
In the Metal Gear series, The Boss is a legendary American soldier, founder and leader of the Cobra Unit, the biological mother of Ocelot, mentor and mother figure to Naked Snake, and is known as the mother of the U.S. special forces. In June 1944, during World War II, she led the Cobra unit to victory at the Battle of Normandy.

The Boss appears as one of the main antagonists in Metal Gear Solid 3: Snake Eater. She moved to the Soviet Union with Colonel Volgin alongside the Cobra Unit. Throughout the game, Naked Snake repeatedly encounters The Boss to kill her as ordered by his superiors. Following Volgin's death, The Boss reveals she is the daughter of one of the original members of the Philosophers behind the Philosophers' Legacy. After one final fight, Snake fights and kills The Boss who gives him the Philosophers' Legacy hidden by Volgin. The whole mission is later revealed to be a coverup by the United States so that The Boss would steal Volgin's treasure and give it to Snake but then die at his hands to avoid a conflict between America and the Soviet Union.

EVA reveals in Metal Gear Solid: Peace Walker that The Boss infiltrated a sleeper agent into the USSR's OKB-1 from 1959 to 1961 to gather more information about the Sputnik program with a little help from the Philosophers. She was eventually commissioned into Project Mercury to test the Mercury capsule and launched into space at roughly the same time as Yuri Gagarin's flight on April 12, 1961. However, the capsule suffered heavy damage upon reentry. The Boss, dubbed within the program as the "Mercury Lady", survived the crash but was rendered comatose for six months. All evidence of her role in the program was erased, including airbrushing her out of an official picture of the Mercury astronauts, of whom she was the eighth member. The Boss's entire personality is also reconstructed in a special AI system developed by Strangelove for the Peace Walker weapon. The Boss died on September 2, 1964, at Tselinoyarsk, USSR, at the age of 42.

Character design

The Boss' likeness was modelled on actress Charlotte Rampling. In the finished game, she wears a pale-colored combat outfit; Kojima originally planned to have her in a blue sneaking suit similar to Solid Snake for the finale of the game, but this idea was ultimately cut. During the shooting of the final scene between The Boss and Naked Snake, Eriko Hirata (The Boss's motion capture actress), having read the script beforehand, was so moved by the scene that she broke down into tears. Hideo Kojima said in 2012, he would "love" to create a new prequel game starring The Boss as the protagonist.

Reception

The Boss received critical acclaim. According to Eurogamer, "The Boss is often touted as being one of the strongest female characters in gaming." In 2007, Tom's Games included The Boss among the 50 greatest female characters in video game history, proposing that she should be portrayed in a live-action adaptation by "Sharon Stone, who reportedly served as the inspiration for the character's design." In 2008, Chip ranked her as the 12th top "girl of gaming". In 2011, UGO included her on their list of the 50 top "video game hotties", commenting that "The Boss is a bit of a tough one because we instantly find her attractive, but we can't find a hint of sexuality to her at all," and adding that "of all the ladies on our list, she's the one we'd be the most wary to mess with." That same year, GamingUnion.net included The Boss on their list of top ten video game heroines for "her sheer strength and determination", similarly commenting "we will simply say the Boss is one chick you do not want to mess with which is why we've given her the number 7 spot." In 2013, Chillopedia placed this "heroic American martyr" 11th on their list of the best female video game characters ever, while Stealthy Box called her "arguably the single most amazing female character in all of video games." That same year, The Boss was also ranked as the ninth best female protagonist in gaming by the staff of GamesTM despite her role as an antagonist. In 2014, Entertainment Weeklys Darren Franich listed her as one of 15 "kick-ass women in videogames", asserting that "in the gloriously crazypants pantheon of Metal Gear baddies, no one can compete with The Boss."

In 2008, the staff of GameSpy placed her at the top of Metal Gear boss battles. She was also included on IGN's 2008 lists of the Metal Gear series' top ten villains (ranked seventh) as well as its top ten boss battles (ranked ninth). That same year, Destructoid ranked this "beautiful" yet "haunting" battle as sixth on their list of top Metal Gear boss fights. In 2012, 1UP.com editor Bob Mackey wrote about the final fight against her that "the confrontation takes place in what could be the most beautiful video game environment of all time, regardless of the PS2's relatively low horsepower." In 2013, PLAY ranked The Boss as the eighth top character in the series, calling her "one of the most important and influential characters in the Metal Gear timeline." She was also voted as the 24th best overall character of the previous decade by Game Informer'''s readers in 2010.

In 2011, Complex ranked her as first on the list of "most diabolical video game she-villains". PlayStation Official Magazine included her on the lists of PlayStation's six meanest mothers in 2011, and listed the MGS3's final battle against her among the ten most emotional moments in PlayStation history in 2012. In 2013, she was placed ninth on the list of worst betrayals in gaming history by Cheat Code Central, who added that "when it came time to die for her country, The Boss did so gracefully and with a sense of style." GamesRadar praised The Boss's role as an antagonist, putting her in their 2013 list of 100 best villains in video games, and commenting: "No wonder Snake ended up saluting her grave; she deserved no less." In 2013, Liz Lanier of Game Informer included The Boss among top ten female villains in video games, stating that "The Boss is regarded as one of the greatest female video game characters of all time, in addition to being one of the most menacing enemies. The Boss doesn't have to resort to cheap tricks or feminine wiles to get her way or gain respect: that's why she's The Boss''." Ryan Bates of Game Revolution placed her first on his 2014 list of top "mean girls in gaming".

References

External links
The Boss - The Metal Gear Wiki - Wikia

Characters designed by Yoji Shinkawa
Female characters in video games
Fictional American diaspora
Fictional American people in video games
Fictional astronauts
Fictional Central Intelligence Agency personnel
Fictional characters who committed sedition or treason
Fictional characters without a name
Fictional defectors
Fictional judoka
Fictional jujutsuka
Fictional martial arts trainers
Fictional martial artists in video games
Fictional military personnel in video games
Fictional secret agents and spies in video games
Fictional soldiers in video games
Fictional Special Air Service personnel
Fictional United States Army personnel
Fictional World War II veterans
Konami antagonists
Metal Gear characters
Video game bosses
Video game characters introduced in 2004
Woman soldier and warrior characters in video games